Green Is Beautiful is an album by American jazz guitarist Grant Green featuring performances recorded in 1970 and released on the Blue Note label.

Reception
The Allmusic review by Steve Huey awarded the album 3 stars and stated "Green Is Beautiful finds the guitarist growing more comfortable with harder, funkier R&B than he seemed on the softer-hued Carryin' On... Green Is Beautiful proves that Green's reinvention as a jazz-funk artist wasn't the misguided disaster it was initially made out to be".

Track listing

Recorded at Rudy Van Gelder Studio, Englewood Cliffs, New Jersey on January 30, 1970

Personnel
Grant Green - guitar
Blue Mitchell - trumpet
Claude Bartee - tenor saxophone
Neal Creque (track 3), Emmanuel Riggins (tracks 1, 2, 4 & 5) - organ
Jimmy Lewis - electric bass
Idris Muhammad - drums
Candido Camero - conga
Richie "Pablo" Landrum - bongos

References 

Blue Note Records albums
Grant Green albums
1970 albums
Albums recorded at Van Gelder Studio
Albums produced by Francis Wolff